Terry Fox Secondary School is a school with approximately 1550 students in Port Coquitlam, British Columbia, Canada. The original building was built in the 1950s under the name "Port Coquitlam Senior Secondary" for grades 11 and 12. In 1986, it was renamed Terry Fox Senior Secondary School after 1976 graduate Terry Fox. The "Senior" was dropped from the name after a restructuring by Coquitlam School District 43, when junior high schools were replaced by middle schools.

Terry Fox Secondary's Code of Conduct is compatible with the District Code of Conduct, The BC Human Rights Code, and they also acknowledge their own four pillars of Leadership, Integrity, Kindness, and Perseverance. 

In 1999, to help deal with the growing population, the school was relocated to a new, larger building, several kilometres away on Riverwood Gate. However, the new building quickly became overpopulated as well, and is now home to 17 portables. Fox offers a wide variety of academic courses and programs at all levels. Creating community is always a focus with dynamic leadership courses and initiatives to build connections in and out of our building. The school offers many honors classes as well as Advanced Placement and Co-op programs and Ace It programs. The School has respected athletic programs, namely in basketball and football, and is usually ranked in both sports.

The Terry Fox football team has also taken part in an exchange with the football team from St. Mark Catholic High School (Ottawa) from Manotick, Ontario since 2009.

The Terry Fox Theatre, a privately run operation, formerly run by the school itself, adjoins the north side of the school. The school is noted for its many musicals and plays including You're a Good Man, Charlie Brown, Footloose, Hair, The Wedding Singer and Jesus Christ Superstar, Tough, Daddy's Home, The Effect of Gamma Rays on Man-in-the-Moon Marigolds, Of Mice and Men and The 25th Annual Putnam County Spelling Bee. In 2010, Terry Fox Secondary became District Champions of "MetFest" with the musical comedy The 25th Annual Putnam County Spelling Bee, going on to represent Terry Fox Secondary at the Sears British Columbia Drama Festival] where they were awarded 'Best Actor in a Leading Role - Female', 'Special Merit Award for Musical Virtuosity', and 'Best Ensemble/ Choreography'. In 2011, Terry Fox's show "Am I Blue" became District Champions at "MetFest".

Provincial championships

Notable alumni

References

External links
 Terry Fox Secondary School website

Terry Fox
High schools in British Columbia
Educational institutions established in 1950
Port Coquitlam
1950 establishments in British Columbia